Bjørn Elvenes (12 June 1944 – 19 August 1988) was a Norwegian ice hockey player, born in Oslo. He played for the Norwegian national ice hockey team, and  participated at the Winter Olympics in 1964, where he placed tenth with the Norwegian team. There are conflicting reports of his death in 1988; he either died of cancer or was killed in a car accident.

References

External links

1944 births
1988 deaths
Ice hockey people from Oslo
Norwegian ice hockey players
Olympic ice hockey players of Norway
Ice hockey players at the 1964 Winter Olympics
Deaths from cancer in Sweden
Road incident deaths in Sweden